The Trade Association Forum (TAF) is an umbrella body for industry trade associations in the United Kingdom. Established in 1997, it is administered by  the Confederation of British Industry. It maintains a Directory that provides information on UK trade associations and the business sectors they represent. It is not a policy setting body but provides its members with services to assist them in the running of their organisations, as well as providing information to buyers, government departments, and the public about UK trade associations and business sectors.

References

External links
 The Trade Association Forum Members' Group at LinkedIn
 Trade Association Forum Members Update (November 2010)

Trade associations based in the United Kingdom
1997 establishments in the United Kingdom